Walford, Letton and Newton is a civil parish in north Herefordshire, England, and approximately  north-northwest from the city and county town of Hereford, and  east from the border with Wales. 

Parish settlements are the village of Walford, at the north, and the hamlets of Letton and Newton farther south. The post town is Craven Arms and post district, SY7. Parish population at the 2011 census was 179.

The A4113 Bromfield to Knighton road runs through the village. Mound remains of a motte-and-bailey are at the east of Walford. Newton comprises a group of farm buildings and a row of six cottages.

At the time of the Domesday Survey Walford was known as 'Waliforde', which may mean 'ford of the Welshmen'.

References

External links

 Walford motte & bailey on Historic Herefordshire Online

Civil parishes in Herefordshire